A Man's Man is a lost 1918 American silent adventure film directed by Oscar Apfel and produced by Paralta Plays. It starred J. Warren Kerrigan and Lois Wilson, the pair famous for appearing in The Covered Wagon.

Plot
As described in a film magazine, mining engineer John Stuart Webster (Kerrigan) is headed for Central America. While on his way to Mexico, at a truck stop in Arizona he saves a handsome young girl Dolores (Wilson) from the annoyance of a traveling salesman, and henceforth falls in love with her. Webster is a peace-loving individual, but is all fight when a fight is required. When he arrives in Sobrante, he runs into one of the periodic revolutions. He rescues Dolores from the revolutionaries, with her father being killed and Webster almost killed. She nurses him back to health, and he saves the country, marries the girl, and they set out on a happy life.

Cast
 J. Warren Kerrigan as John Stuart Webster
 Lois Wilson as Dolores Ruey
 Kenneth Harlan as Billy Geary
 Edward Coxen as John Cafferty
 Ida Lewis as Mother Jenks
 Harry von Meter as Ricardo Ruey
 Eugene Pallette as Captain Benevido
 Ernest Pasqué as Captain Arredondo
 Arthur Allardt as Dr. Pacheo
 Joseph J. Dowling as President Sarros
 John Steppling as Neddy Jerome
 Wallace Worsley as Henry Jenks

1923 version
Apparently this film was re-released by FBO in 1923 in a 50-minute version.

References

External links

 Kyne, Peter B. (1917), Webster - Man's Man, Doubleday, Page & Company, on the Internet Archive

1918 films
American silent feature films
Lost American films
Films directed by Oscar Apfel
1910s romance films
American black-and-white films
American romance films
Films distributed by W. W. Hodkinson Corporation
1910s American films